Terrance Hobbs (born April 6, 1970) is an American musician and the lead guitarist in the American death metal band Suffocation. Hobbs has been a constant member in the band since their first released title Reincremated along with band mates Frank Mullen and Mike Smith, who all met in high school. Hobbs also played in the deathgrind project, Criminal Element, which featured fellow Suffocation member  Derek Boyer.

Techniques 
Hobbs is renowned in the death metal scene for having combined fast and repetitive barred riffing closely accompanied by other swept and often technical unexpected patterns: laying down the basics of Technical/Brutal death metal of today. Typically, his shred-heavy, bizarre sounding, "mocking" solos, are famously accompanied with signature tremolo use, usually in the form of divebombs, trills and other unusual techniques. Pierced from Within contains many examples of this, with an array of atmospheric, palm-muted breakdowns and complex riffs, along with Effigy of the Forgotten and Souls to Deny, the latter of which features a great deal of layered riffing and melodies.

Equipment 
Hobbs mainly uses a custom B.C. Rich Warlock installed with a Floyd Rose locking tremolo, a DiMarzio Super Distortion bridge pickup, Gotoh tuners, and fitted with D'Addario strings. His pedals include a Maxon OD-9 overdrive pedal, and a Boss NS-2 Noise Suppressor. His amplification consists of a Peavey 6505+ played through Vader cabinets.

References 

1970 births
African-American guitarists
African-American rock musicians
American heavy metal guitarists
American male guitarists
Death metal musicians
Guitarists from New York (state)
Lead guitarists
Living people
People from Long Island
Suffocation (band) members
21st-century American guitarists
21st-century American male musicians
21st-century African-American musicians
20th-century African-American people